Ruslans Sorokins (born 11 March 1982) is a Latvian beach volleyball player. As of 2012, he plays with Aleksandrs Samoilovs. They qualified for 2012 Summer Olympics in London, where they reached the last 16.

References 

1982 births
Sportspeople from Riga
Latvian beach volleyball players
Living people
Beach volleyball players at the 2012 Summer Olympics
Olympic beach volleyball players of Latvia
European Games competitors for Latvia
Beach volleyball players at the 2015 European Games